Not So Dumb is a 1930 pre-Code comedy motion picture starring Marion Davies, directed by King Vidor, and produced for Cosmopolitan Productions for Metro-Goldwyn-Mayer.

It is based on the stage play Dulcy by George S. Kaufman and Marc Connelly that starred Lynn Fontanne. The film resulted in a financial loss for the studio of $39,000.

This is a re-make of the 1923 film Dulcy. See also the 1940 film of the same name (Dulcy).

Plot summary
Dulcinea Parker (Marion Davies) goes to the train station to meet the Forbes: mother Eleanor (Julia Faye), father Charles (William Holden), and daughter Angela (Sally Starr), whom she has invited to spend the weekend. We are also introduced to her new butler Perkins (George Davis), who is an ex-convict on parole.

Dulcinea, ever the "dumb blonde", has a habit of doing the wrong thing. She misquotes common expressions and butchers the King's English. She and her brother Bill, whom she calls Willie (Raymond Hackett), who's in love with Angela, host the Forbes and several other guests for the weekend. Dulcinea is scheming to get Mr. Forbes to invest in her fiance' Gordon's (Elliott Nugent) costume jewelry business.

She plays matchmaker to Angela by pairing her with the flamboyant "scenario writer" Vincent Leach (Franklin Pangborn), who enthusiastically tells his latest story for over two hours. Dulcinea's matchmaking efforts are fruitful, and Angela plans to elope with Vincent. Willie, still carrying a torch for Angela, offers to drive the clandestine couple to their wedding. Later, only Angela & Willie return, married.

Dulcinea also entertains a golf enthusiast, Schuyler Van Dyke, who offers to fund Gordon's enterprise (and shamelessly flirts with Mrs. Forbes). Emboldened, Gordon tells off Mr. Forbes. All is well until a man named Patterson arrives; the brother of "Van Dyke", who apparently suffers from delusions of grandeur. Realizing that Gordon's funding is a fantasy, panic ensues. But, since Mr. Forbes recognizes Mr. Patterson as the real Schuyler Van Dyke's attorney, he doesn't believe Van Dyke's a fake. So, fortunately for all, Mr. Forbes outbids Van Dyke's investment, thus making Dulcinea an accidental hero and a not-so-dumb blonde.

Cast
 Marion Davies as Dulcinea Parker
 Elliott Nugent as Gordon Smith
 Raymond Hackett as Willie Parker
 Franklin Pangborn as Vincent Leach
 Julia Faye as Eleanor Forbes
 William Holden as Charles Roger Forbes
 Donald Ogden Stewart as Skylar Van Dyke/Horace Patterson
 Sally Starr as Angela Forbes
 George Davis as Perkins
 Ruby Lafayette as Grandma (uncredited)

References
 "The Screen" by Mordaunt Hall. The New York Times, February 8, 1930.

External links
 
 
 
 

1930 films
1930 comedy films
American black-and-white films
American comedy films
1930s English-language films
American films based on plays
Films directed by King Vidor
Metro-Goldwyn-Mayer films
Films with screenplays by Wanda Tuchock
1930s American films